This list includes the appointment date and performance record of current Australian Football League senior coaches. The league consists of 18 clubs across Australia, with at least two clubs in every state/territory apart from Tasmania, the Australian Capital Territory and the Northern Territory.

Damien Hardwick, the senior coach of the Richmond Football Club since August 2009, is currently the longest-serving coach in the league. He has also won the most premierships (3) among active coaches. Chris Scott, the senior coach of the Geelong Football Club since October 2010, has won the most matches (179) and has the best winning percentage at 70.28%. Six coaches have won at least one AFL premiership during their current term: Chris Scott in 2011,2022; John Longmire in 2012; Luke Beveridge in 2016; Damien Hardwick in 2017, 2019 and 2020; Adam Simpson in 2018; and Simon Goodwin in 2021.

Coaches
Key

Statistics are correct to the end of the 2022 AFL season

See also

List of current AFL Women's coaches

Notes

References

Australian Football League coaches
Coaches